Elena Rafti is the Cypriot Ambassador to Austria.  She presented her credentials on July 7, 2018.  On August 17, 2018, she presented her credentials for the position of the International Anti-Corruption Academy.  She has also served, at the same time, as the non-resident Ambassador to Slovenia and is the Cypriot Ambassador/permanent representative to the permanent mission to the United Nationa in Vienna.

References

21st-century Cypriot women politicians
Living people
Women ambassadors
Ambassadors of Cyprus to Austria
Permanent Representatives of Cyprus to the United Nations
Ambassadors of Cyprus to Slovenia
Year of birth missing (living people)